Khalil  was an Indian cinema actor of silent and talkie films. He achieved stardom with silent films like Gul-E-Bakavali (1924), Kulin Kanta (1925), and Lanka Ni Laadi (1925) which was a major success commercially.
His other successes included Cinema Queen (1925) with Sulochana, Draupadi (1931), and Daily Mail (1930).  Khalil is referred to as the "macho hero".

Khalil worked from 1920 to 1941, making a transition to Talkies in 1931 with Draupadi directed by B. P. Mishra, and Daulat Ka Nasha directed by Pesi Karani. Both films were produced by Kohinoor and Imperial Films. He shifted to Calcutta from Bombay in 1934, and immediately "made his mark" with the East India Film Company production Quismat Ki Kasauti (1934), directed by Pesi Karani. He also wrote lyrics for films like Dard-e-Dil (1934).

Career

Silent films
Khalil's first film was Krishna Sudama (1920), a silent film co-produced by Kohinoor Film Company and Imperial Film Company. He joined the Kohinoor Film Company in 1925, along with other known actors of that time like Raja Sandow, Zubeida and Tara. Some of his notable silent films were Sati Parvati (1920), Mahasati Ansuya (1921), Rukmani Haran (1921), Malti Madhav (1922), Surya Kumari (1922) and Manorama (1924).

In 1924, he acted as a "lecherous Maharaja" in Kulin Kanta. The film was based on a true incident cited as the Bawla murder case, and depicted the story of the Maharaja Tukoji Rao Holkar III of Indore and a dancing girl who wanted to escape from the harem.

In 1925, Khalil acted as a shepherd in love with a princess he saves, in Kohinoor Film Company's fantasy production called Lanka Ni Laadi, also known as Fairy Of Ceylon. The film was directed by Homi Master with story by Mohanlal G. Dave. It co-starred Gohar and Jamna. The film became Gohar's first "major" hit and "grossed more than any other film in 1925".

Talkies

Khalil joined Indian Talkies 1931, and worked in the two films produced by them, Draupadi and Daulat Ka Nasha.  Draupadi, also called The Daughter Of King Drupad, was the story of Draupadi from the epic Mahabharata. It was produced by the Imperial Film Company and directed by Bhagwati Prasad Mishra. Khalil played Lord Krishna with actress Ermiline playing Draupadi. Daulat Ka Nasha was directed by Pesi Karani.

He continued to make his mark with films like Bharat Mata (1932), directed by Pesi Karani, Niti Vijay (1932), directed by Moti Gidwani, Do Rangi Duniya, directed by Pesi Karani and Saubhagya Sundari, directed by Homi Master. All films were produced by Imperial Film Company.

In 1934, Khalil acted in Mazdoor, also known as The Mill, which was directed by Mohan Dayaram Bhavnani for Ajanta Cinetone. Written by Munshi Premchand, it was one of the first talkies to be banned by British censors in India.

Khalil shifted from Bombay to Calcutta, where he achieved success working again with Karani in East India Films' Kismet Ki Kasauti (1934).  With Madan Theatres Ltd. he worked in Miss Manorama (1935) and Bulbul-e-Iran (1936), directed by Faredoon Irani,  and in Miss Parivartan, directed by Ezra Mir.

In 1937, Khalil acted in Whose Darling?, also called Kiski Pyari?. He played the second lead to Jal Merchant and Zubeida. The film was written and directed by Akhtar Nawaz. The advertisement in filmindia called it a "Heart-throbbing Rajput story of love, romance and chivalry". The film was produced by Sunrise Film Co. from The Tollywood Studios.

Personal life and death
A Muslim by birth, he performed varied roles in films. His initial acting phase had him playing Hindu Gods in mythology films. He portrayed Krishna and Rama several times. Disenchanted by the communalism arising in the film industry, he made a speech against it at the Indian Motion Pictures Congress on 4 May 1939. A section was quoted in his obituary in the cine-mag Filmindia in 1941:

Khalil died on 28 October 1941, in Calcutta, after a short illness. He was thirty-seven years old and left behind "a widow" and "five children".

Filmography
Lists:

Silent films

Talkies
A partial list:

References

External links
 

1903 births
1941 deaths
Male actors in Hindi cinema
Indian male silent film actors
20th-century Indian male actors